WGPS-LD (channel 22) is a low-power television station in Fort Myers, Florida, United States, affiliated with Cozi TV. The station is owned by HC2 Holdings through licensee DTV America Corporation.

History
WGPS-LD served as an affiliate of Daystar during much of the late 1990s, 2000s, and early 2010s while under the callsigns of W59CY for the first four years, W22CL from 1999 to 2013, and then under the WGPS-LP calls from 2013 to 2020. On May 28, 2020, the callsign was changed to WGPS-LD.

On July 1, 2014, WGPS-LP became affiliated with Estrella TV on its main subchannel, with DrTV on its second subchannel.

In 2015, two more subchannels were added. In Summer of that year, Sonlife was launched onto WGPS-LD3. In December, Grit was launched onto a fourth digital subchannel. During that month, DrTV was replaced by Sony Pictures Television's GetTV network on DT2.

On November 29, 2016, Cozi TV replaced Estrella TV on DT1; two days later, Estrella TV replaced the defunct MundoMax network on WXCW-DT2.

Subchannels
The station's digital signal is multiplexed:

References

External links

CDBS (RecNet) Database - Information on WGPS-LD

GPS-LD
Buzzr affiliates
Cozi TV affiliates
GetTV affiliates
Laff (TV network) affiliates
Scripps News affiliates
Daystar (TV network) affiliates
Defy TV affiliates
TrueReal affiliates
Television channels and stations established in 2001
Low-power television stations in the United States
Innovate Corp.
2001 establishments in Florida